The First Batch of Major Historical and Cultural Sites Protected at the National Level in China was announced by the State Council of the People's Republic of China on March 4, 1961 containing 180 sites. One site was removed on October 26, 1964 and restored on October 16, 1981 (the Palace of the Zhong King of the Taiping Heavenly Kingdom).

Revolutionary Sites and Memorials (33 Sites)

Caves Temples (14 Sites)

Ancient Buildings and Historical Monuments (77 Sites)

Stone Carvings (11 Sites)

Archeological Sites (26 Sites)

Ancient Burial Sites (19 Sites)

See Also 

 Major Historical and Cultural Site Protected at the National Level
 Major Nationally Protected Historical and Cultural Site Of China (Second Batch)
 Major Nationally Protected Historical and Cultural Site Of China (Third Batch)
 Major Nationally Protected Historical and Cultural Site Of China (Fourth Batch)
 Major Nationally Protected Historical and Cultural Site Of China (Fifth Batch)
 Major Nationally Protected Historical and Cultural Site Of China (Sixth Batch)
 Major Nationally Protected Historical and Cultural Site Of China (Seventh Batch)
 Major Nationally Protected Historical and Cultural Site Of China (Eighth Batch)

References

Source 

Historic sites in China